Syllepte cohaesalis is a moth in the family Crambidae. It was described by Francis Walker in 1866. It is found in Indonesia (Sula Islands, Tanimbar Islands), India and on Fiji.

References

Moths described in 1866
cohaesalis
Moths of Indonesia
Moths of Asia
Moths of Fiji